In computer science, Actor model implementation concerns implementation issues for the Actor model.

Cosmic Cube
The Caltech Cosmic Cube was developed by Chuck Seitz et al. at Caltech providing architectural support for Actor systems.  A significant difference between the Cosmic Cube and
most other parallel processors is that this multiple instruction
multiple-data machine uses message passing
instead of shared variables for communication between
concurrent processes. This computational model is reflected
in the hardware structure and operating system,
and is also the explicit message passing communication seen by the programmer.  According to Seitz [1985]:

It was a premise of the Cosmic Cube experiment that the internode communication should scale well to very large numbers of nodes. A direct network like the hypercube satisfies this requirement, with respect to both the aggregate bandwidth achieved across the many concurrent communication channels and the feasibility of the implementation. The hypercube is actually a distributed variant of an indirect logarithmic switching network like the Omega or banyan networks: the kind that might be used in shared-storage organizations. With the hypercube, however, communication paths traverse different numbers of channels and so exhibit different latencies. It is possible, therefore, to take advantage of communication locality in placing processes in nodes.

J–Machine
The J–Machine was developed by Bill Dally et al. at MIT providing architectural support suitable for Actors.
This included the following:
Asynchronous messaging
A uniform space of Actor addresses to which messages could be sent concurrently regardless of whether the recipient Actor was local or nonlocal
A form of Actor pipelining (see Actor model)
Concurrent Smalltalk (which can be modeled using Actors) was developed to program the J Machine.

Prototype Actor Programming Language
Hewitt [2006] presented a prototype Actor programming language in the sense that it directly expresses important aspects of the behavior of Actors.
Messages are expressed in XML using the notation
:<tag>[<element>1 ... <element>] for
“<”<tag>“>” <element>1 ... <element>n “<”/<tag>“>”

The semantics of the programming language are defined by defining each program construct as an Actor with its own behavior.  Execution is modeled by having Eval messages passed among program constructs during execution.

Environment Actors
Each Eval message has the address of an Actor that acts as an environment with the bindings of program identifiers.  Environment Actors are immutable, i.e., they do not change.
When Request[Bind[identifier value] customer] is received by an Actor Environment, a new environment Actor is created such that
when the new environment Actor receives
Request[Lookup[identifier’] customer’] then if identifier is the same as identifier’ send customer’ Returned[value], else send Environment
Request[Lookup[identifier’] customer’].
The above builds on an Actor EmptyEnvironment which
when it receives Request[Lookup[identifier] customer], sends customer Thrown[NotFound[identifier]].
When it receives a Bind request EmptyEnvironment acts like Environment above.

Expressions
The prototype programming language has expressions of the following kinds:

 <identifier>
When Request[Eval[environment] customer] is received, send environment Request[Lookup[<identifier>] customer]

 send <recipient> <communication>
When Request[Eval[environment] customer] is received, send <recipient> Request[Eval[environment] evalCustomer1] where evalCustomer1  is a new Actor such that
when evalCustomer1 receives the communication Returned[theRecipient], then send <communication>
Request[Eval[environment] evalCustomer2] where evalCustomer2 is a new actor such that
when evalCustomer2 receives the communication Returned[theCommunication], then send theRecipient theCommunication.

<recipient>.<message>
When Request[Eval[environment] customer] is received, send <recipient> Request[Eval[environment] evalCustomer1] such that
when evalCustomer1  receives the communication Returned[theRecipient],  then send <message> Request[Eval[environment] evalCustomer2] such that
when evalCustomer2 receives the communication Returned[theMessage], then send theRecipient
Request[theMessage customer]

receiver ... <pattern>i <expression>i ...
When Request[Eval[environment] customer] is received, send customer a new actor theReceiver such that 
when theReceiver receives a communication com, then create a new bindingCustomer and send environment
Request[Bind[<pattern>i com] bindingCustomer] and
if bindingCustomer receives Returned[environment’], send <expression>i
Request[Eval[environment’]]
otherwise if bindingCustomer receives Thrown[...], try <pattern>i+1

 behavior ... <pattern>i <expression>i ...
When Request[Eval[environment] customer] is received, send customer a new actor theReceiver such that 
when theReceiver receives Request[message customer’], then create a new bindingCustomer and send environment
Request[bind[<pattern>i message] customer’] and
 if bindingCustomer receives Returned[environment’], send <expression>i
Request[Eval[environment’] customer’]
 otherwise if bindingCustomer receives Thrown[...], try <pattern>i+1

{<expression>1, <expression>2}
When Request[Eval[environment] customer] is received, send <expression>1 Request[Eval[environment]] and concurrently send <expression>2 Request[Eval[environment]] customer].

 let <identifier> = <expression>value in <expression>body
When message[Eval[environment] customer] is received, then create a new evalCustomer and send <expression>value
Request[Eval[environment] evalCustomer1.
When evalCustomer receives Returned[theValue], create a new bindingCustomer and send environment
Request[bind[<identifier> theValue] bindingCustomer]
When bindingCustomer receives Returned[environment’], send <expression>body Request[Eval[environment’] customer]

 serializer <expression>
When Request[Eval[environment] customer] is received, then send customer Returned[theSerializer] where theSerializer is a new actor such that communications sent to theSerializer are processed in FIFO order with a behavior Actor that is initially <expression>.Eval[environment] and
When communication com is received by theSerializer, then send the behavior Actor Request[com customer’] where customer’ is a new actor such that
when customer’ receives Returned[theNextBehavior] then theNextBehavior is used as the behavior Actor for the next communication received by theSerializer.

Example program
An example program for a simple storage cell that can contain any Actor address is as follows:

 Cell ≡
 receiver
 Request[Create[initial] customer]
 send customer Returned[serializer ReadWrite(initial)]
The above program which creates a storage cell makes use of the behavior ReadWrite which is defined as follows:

 ReadWrite(contents) ≡
 behavior
 Request[read[] customer]
 {send customer Returned[contents], ReadWrite(contents)}
 Request[write[x] customer]
 {send customer Returned[], ReadWrite(x)}

Note that the above behavior is pipelined, i.e., the behavior might still be processing a previous read or write message while it is processing a subsequent read or write message..
For example, the following expression creates a cell x with initial contents 5 and then concurrently writes to it with the values 7 and 9.

let x = Cell.Create[5] in {x.write[7], x.write[9], x.read[]}

The value of the above expression is 5, 7 or 9.

See also
 Actor model and process calculi
 Actor model theory

References
Henry Baker and Carl Hewitt The Incremental Garbage Collection of Processes Proceedings of the Symposium on Artificial Intelligence Programming Languages. SIGPLAN Notices 12, August 1977.
Peter Bishop Very Large Address Space Modularly Extensible Computer Systems MIT EECS Doctoral Dissertation. June 1977.
Henry Baker. Actor Systems for Real-Time Computation MIT EECS Doctoral Dissertation. January 1978.
Carl Hewitt and Russ Atkinson.  Specification and Proof Techniques for Serializers IEEE Journal on Software Engineering. January 1979.
Ken Kahn. A Computational Theory of Animation MIT EECS Doctoral Dissertation. August 1979.
Carl Hewitt, Beppe Attardi, and Henry Lieberman.  Delegation in Message Passing Proceedings of First International Conference on Distributed Systems Huntsville, AL. October 1979.
Bill Kornfeld and Carl Hewitt.  The Scientific Community Metaphor IEEE Transactions on Systems, Man, and Cybernetics.  January 1981.
Henry Lieberman. Thinking About Lots of Things at Once without Getting Confused: Parallelism in Act 1 MIT AI memo 626.  May 1981.
Henry Lieberman. A Preview of Act 1 MIT AI memo 625.  June 1981.
Bill Kornfeld.  Parallelism in Problem Solving MIT EECS Doctoral Dissertation. August 1981.
Daniel Theriault.  A Primer for the Act-1 Language  MIT AI memo 672. April 1982.
Henry Lieberman and Carl Hewitt.  A real Time Garbage Collector Based on the Lifetimes of Objects CACM June 1983.
Daniel Theriault.  Issues in the Design and Implementation of Act 2  MIT AI technical report 728. June 1983.
Henry Lieberman.  An Object-Oriented Simulator for the Apiary Conference of the American Association for Artificial Intelligence, Washington, D. C., August 1983.
Carl Hewitt and Henry Lieberman.  Design Issues in Parallel Architecture for Artificial Intelligence MIT AI memo 750.  Nov. 1983.
Charles Seitz. The Cosmic Cube CACM. Jan. 1985.
Carl Manning. Traveler: the Actor observatory ECOOP 1987. Also appears in Lecture Notes in Computer Science, vol. 276.
Carl Manning,.  Acore: The Design of a Core Actor Language and its Compile MastersThesis. MIT EECS. Maiy 1987.
William Athas and Charles Seitz Multicomputers:  message-passing concurrent computers IEEE Computer August 1988.
William Athas and Nanette Boden Cantor: An Actor Programming System for Scientific Computing in Proceedings of the NSF Workshop on Object-Based Concurrent Programming.  1988.  Special Issue of SIGPLAN Notices.
Jean-Pierre Briot.  From objects to actors: Study of a limited symbiosis in Smalltalk-80 Rapport de Recherche 88-58, RXF-LITP, Paris, France, September 1988
William Dally and Wills, D. Universal mechanisms for concurrency PARLE ‘89.
W. Horwat, A. Chien, and W. Dally. Experience with CST:  Programming and Implementation PLDI. 1989.
Akinori Yonezawa, Ed. ABCL: An Object-Oriented Concurrent System MIT Press. 1990.
Carl Hewitt and Gul Agha.  Guarded Horn clause languages: are they deductive and Logical? in Artificial Intelligence at MIT, Vol. 2. MIT Press 1991.
Carl Hewitt and Jeff Inman.  DAI Betwixt and Between:  From "Intelligent Agents" to Open Systems Science IEEE Transactions on Systems, Man, and Cybernetics.  Nov./Dec. 1991.
William Dally, et al. The Message-Driven Processor: A Multicomputer Processing Node with Efficient Mechanisms IEEE Micro. April 1992.
Don Box, David Ehnebuske, Gopal Kakivaya, Andrew Layman, Noah Mendelsohn, Henrik Nielsen, Satish Thatte, Dave Winer. Simple Object Access Protocol (SOAP) 1.1 W3C Note. May 2000.

Carl Hewitt.  The repeated demise of logic programming and why it will be reincarnated   What Went Wrong and Why: Lessons from AI Research and Applications.  Technical Report SS-06-08. AAAI Press.  March 2006.

Actor model (computer science)